Fusinus lightbourni is a species of sea snail, a marine gastropod mollusc in the family Fasciolariidae.

References

lightbourni
Gastropods described in 1984